Queen City Independent School District is a public school district based in Queen City, Texas (USA).

In addition to Queen City, the district also serves the town of Domino and a small portion of Atlanta.

In 2009, the school district was rated "academically acceptable" by the Texas Education Agency.

Schools
Queen City High School (Grades 9-12)
Morris Upchurch Middle (Grades 5-8)
J.K. Hileman Elementary (Grades PK-4)

References

External links
Queen City ISD

School districts in Cass County, Texas